Shyam. K. Naidu (born: Kamireddy Shyam Naidu) is an Indian cinematographer known for his work in Tollywood. He is known for his collaborations with Puri Jagannadh, of which, Pokiri, was screened at the IIFA Film Festival in Bangkok, in 2006.

Filmography

Awards and nominations
2nd South Indian International Movie Awards
 Nominated—Best Cinematographer (Telugu) South Indian International Movie Awards for Business Man

References

External links 
 

Telugu film cinematographers
Telugu people
Living people
Cinematographers from Andhra Pradesh
Year of birth missing (living people)